Fray Servando is a metro station along Line 4 of the Mexico City Metro. It is located in the Venustiano Carranza borough of Mexico City.

Name and iconography
The station logo depicts the bust of Fray Servando Teresa de Mier, a friar who participated in Mexican independence.

General information
Fray Servando, like other stations of line four, is located near Congreso de la Unión Avenue. This station serves Aeronáutica Militar and Merced Balbuena neighborhoods.  The station was opened on 26 May 1982.

From 23 April to 14 June 2020, the station was temporarily closed due to the COVID-19 pandemic in Mexico.

Ridership

Nearby
Parque de los Periodistas Ilustres, park.
Seat of the Venustiano Carranza borough.

Exits
East: Avenida Congreso de la Unión and Fray Servando Teresa de Mier, Colonia Aeronáutica Militar
West: Avenida Congreso de la Unión and Fray Servando Teresa de Mier, Colonia Merced Balbuena

References

External links 

Fray Servando
Railway stations opened in 1982
1982 establishments in Mexico
Mexico City Metro stations in Venustiano Carranza, Mexico City